Maitland Plan (Spanish, Plan de Maitland), refers to a plan created by British Major General Thomas Maitland in 1800. The plan was titled Plan to capture Buenos Aires and Chile, and then emancipate Peru and Quito. The Kingdom of Great Britain was by then at war with the Kingdom of Spain and the French First Republic in the Napoleonic Wars, and was seeking to expand its influence in South America since the loss of the Thirteen Colonies of North America, which had become independent some time before. 

The plan consisted in:
Seize control of Buenos Aires.
Take position in Mendoza.
Coordinate actions with an independentist Chilean army.
Cross the Andes.
Defeat the Spanish and take control of Chile.
Continue through sea and liberate Peru.

The British tried to put the plan in practice twice and failed. They attempted to seize Buenos Aires and Montevideo in 1806 and 1807, during the British invasions of the Río de la Plata, but were eventually defeated by the Spanish army and the local militias. British military actions against Spanish South America ceased during the Peninsular War, when France turned against Spain and Britain allied itself with the Spanish resistance. 

According to Argentine historians like Felipe Pigna and Rodolfo Terragno, José de San Martín, the Argentine general and prime leader of the southern part of South America's successful struggle for independence from the Spanish Empire, was introduced to the plan (during his stay in London in 1811) by members of the Logia Lautaro: a Freemasonic Lodge founded by Francisco de Miranda and Scottish Lord MacDuff (James Duff, 4th Earl Fife). San Martín was allegedly part of the lodge, and he took the Maitland Plan as a blueprint for the movements necessary to defeat the Spanish army in South America; he carried on successfully with the last five points of the plan, and thus liberated a great part of the continent.

Bibliography
 Terragno, Rodolfo. Maitland & San Martin. Universidad Nacional de Quilmes, 1998. 
Maitland & San Martin, download available, Spanish version only

1800 in the British Empire
1800 in the Spanish Empire
Cancelled invasions
José de San Martín
Argentine War of Independence
1800 in the Captaincy General of Chile
History of Peru
1800 in military history
British invasions of the River Plate
Invasions by the United Kingdom
Spain–United Kingdom military relations